Colonel Windham Henry Wyndham-Quin, 5th Earl of Dunraven and Mount-Earl  (7 February 1857 – 23 October 1952) was an Irish Peer, British Army officer and a Conservative Member of Parliament for South Glamorganshire 1895–1906.

Background

He was the son of Captain Hon. Windham Henry Wyndham-Quin (1829–1865), a younger son of Windham Quin, 2nd Earl of Dunraven and Mount-Earl, by his wife Caroline Tyler, daughter of Rear-Admiral Sir George Tyler. He succeeded to the Earldom on the death of his cousin Windham Wyndham-Quin, 4th Earl of Dunraven and Mount-Earl, who died in 1926 without male issue.

Military and political career

Wyndham-Quin was a major in the 16th Lancers, and served in the First Boer War in 1881.

He again volunteered for service in South Africa in early 1900, during the Second Boer War, and was appointed a captain in the Imperial Yeomanry on 14 February 1900. He raised and commanded the 4th (Glamorgan) Company, IY, which left Liverpool on the SS Cymric in March 1900 to serve as a company of the 1st Battalion Imperial Yeomanry. On 18 April 1900 he was appointed 2nd in command of this battalion.  He was mentioned in despatches, received the Queen's medal (3 clasps), and was awarded the Distinguished Service Order (DSO) in November 1900. On return from South Africa he raised and commanded the Glamorgan Imperial Yeomanry, a full regiment that perpetuated 4th Company. He was promoted to the honorary rank of colonel on 19 Oct 1901.

In the 1895 general election he was elected Member of Parliament for South Glamorganshire, winning the seat for the Conservative Party. He was re-elected in 1900, but lost the seat in the 1906 general election.

He served as High Sheriff of County Kilkenny for 1914.

Family
He married Lady Eva Constance Aline Bourke, daughter of Richard Southwell Bourke, 6th Earl of Mayo. They had the following children:

Richard Southwell Windham Robert Wyndham-Quin, 6th Earl of Dunraven and Mount-Earl (1887–1965)
Captain Hon. Valentine Maurice Wyndham-Quin (22 May 1890 – 1983), married Marjorie Pretyman in 1919 and had three daughters, including Marjorie Olein, wife of Robert Gascoyne-Cecil, 6th Marquess of Salisbury, and Pamela, wife of John Wyndham, 6th Baron Leconfield
Lady Olein Wyndham-Quin (5 March 1892 – 1969)
Miss Kathleen Sybil Wyndham-Quin (1895–1907)

He died at Adare Manor and is buried at St. Nicholas' Church of Ireland in Adare, County Limerick, Ireland.

Publications
 The Yeomanry Cavalry of Gloucester and Monmouth (1897)
 Sir Charles Tyler, GCB, Admiral of the White (1912)
 The Foxhound in County Limerick

References

External links

 

1857 births
1952 deaths
16th The Queen's Lancers officers
British Army personnel of the Second Boer War
British Yeomanry officers
Companions of the Distinguished Service Order
Companions of the Order of the Bath
Wyndham-Quin, Windham Henry
Wyndham-Quin, Windham Henry
Wyndham-Quin, Windham Henry
Dunraven and Mount-Earl, E5
High Sheriffs of County Kilkenny
Glamorgan Yeomanry officers
Earls of Dunraven and Mount-Earl